Coquille National Forest was established in Oregon by the U.S. Forest Service on March 2, 1907 with .  On July 1, 1908 it was combined with Siskiyou National Forest and the name was discontinued.

References

External links
Forest History Society
Forest History Society:Listing of the National Forests of the United States Text from Davis, Richard C., ed. Encyclopedia of American Forest and Conservation History. New York: Macmillan Publishing Company for the Forest History Society, 1983. Vol. II, pp. 743-788.

Former National Forests of Oregon
Rogue River-Siskiyou National Forest
1907 establishments in Oregon
Protected areas established in 1907
1908 disestablishments in Oregon